Alternatively, "Pelomedusidae" may refer to the Pelomedusoidea. See below for details.

Pelomedusidae is a family of freshwater turtles endemic to sub-Saharan Africa, including  Madagascar, São Tomé, and the Seychelles(Although this pop. may have been introduced by humans). They are unable to fully withdraw their heads into their shells, instead drawing them to the side and folding them beneath the upper edge of their shells, hence are called African side-necked turtles.

The family contains two living genera. They are distinguished from their closest relatives by a hinge in the front section of the plastron.

Pelomedusidae spends most of its time in the mud at the bottom of rivers or shallow lakes, where they eat invertebrates, such as insects, mollusks, and worms. Many species aestivate through the dry season, burying themselves in the mud.

Systematics and taxonomy 
The related Podocnemididae is either treated as a distinct family or as a subfamily (Podocnemidinae) in the Pelomedusidae. The African side-necked turtles are then also demoted to subfamily rank, as the Pelomedusinae.

As taxonomic rank is only meaningful as part of a sequence (a biological "family" has no fixed meaning on its own), both treatments are technically correct. Ultimately, the issue hinges upon the Austro-American side neck turtles (Chelidae). These Pleurodira are less closely related to the Podocnemididae and Pelomedusidae than these are to each other. If all three are ranked as full families, the Chelidae is treated as a basal lineage, while the other two are united in the superfamily Pelomedusoidea. This treatment is preferred here, because it allows more convenient placement of prehistoric pleurodires (e.g. the Bothremydidae).

References

Further reading
Edward Drinker Cope. 1868. An Examination of the REPTILIA and BATRACHIA obtained by the Orton Expedition to Equador [sic] and the Upper Amazon, with notes on other species. Proc. Acad. Nat. Sci. Philadelphia 20: 96-140. (Pelomedusidæ, new family, p. 119).
Goin CJ, Goin OB, Zug GR. 1978. Introduction to Herpetology: Third Edition. San Francisco: W.H. Freeman and Company. xi + 378 pp. . (Family Pelomedusidae, pp. 271–272).

External links 

 Family Pelomedusidae on reptile-database.org

 
Turtle families
 
 
Taxa named by Edward Drinker Cope